Bollerud is a surname. Notable people with the surname include:

Ingunn Bollerud (born 1972), Norwegian cyclist
Mona Bollerud (born 1968), Norwegian biathlete